Austrodrillia rawitensis is a species of sea snail, a marine gastropod mollusk in the family Horaiclavidae.

It was previously categorized within the family Turridae.

Description
The length of the shell attains 15 mm, its diameter 6 mm.

Distribution
This marine species is endemic to New Zealand

References

  Hedley, Charles. A revision of the Australian Turridae. Vol. 13. 1922 
 Powell, A.W.B. 1979: New Zealand Mollusca: Marine, Land and Freshwater Shells, Collins, Auckland 
 Maxwell, P.A. (1988) Late Miocene deep-water Mollusca from the Stillwater Mudstone at Greymouth, Westland, New Zealand: paleoecology and systematics. New Zealand Geological Survey Paleontological Bulletin, 55, 1–120
 Morley, M.S., Hayward, B.W., Raven, J.L., Foreman, G.A., Grenfell, H.R. 2006: Intertidal and shallow subtidal biota of Mahia Peninsula, Hawkes Bay, Records of the Auckland Museum, 43

External links
  Spencer H.G., Willan R.C., Marshall B.A. & Murray T.J. (2011) Checklist of the Recent Mollusca Recorded from the New Zealand Exclusive Economic Zone

rawitensis
Gastropods of New Zealand